Franco Colela (born 5 January 1995) is an Argentine footballer who plays for Club Agropecuario Argentino as a midfielder.

References

External links

1996 births
Living people
Association football midfielders
Argentine footballers
Club Atlético Banfield footballers
Club Agropecuario Argentino players
Sportspeople from Buenos Aires Province